Park County is a county in the U.S. state of Montana. At the 2020 census, the population was 17,191. Its county seat is Livingston. A small part of Yellowstone National Park is in the southern part of the county.

History
The Territorial Legislature of Montana Territory authorized Park County on February 23, 1887. It was named for its proximity to Yellowstone National Park, part of which is now in the county.

This area had long been peopled and hunted by indigenous peoples, including the Crow, Sioux, and Blackfoot tribes. The first recorded visit of European-descent people was the Lewis and Clark Expedition (1805). Mountain man Jim Bridger wintered with Crow nomads near present-day Emigrant in 1844–45.

Hunting and trapping brought many men across this area during the first part of the 19th century, but by 1850 the beaver population had nearly disappeared. Gold was discovered in Emigrant Gulch in 1863, and by 1864 a booming town was serving the area. In late 1864, Yellowstone City, consisting of 75 cabins, was in operation.

Two miners, John Bozeman and John Jacobs, laid out the Bozeman Trail in 1864 to allow access to western Montana Territory, and it soon became a well-traveled path between Fort Laramie and western Montana. The road ran through the future Livingston area to Bozeman Pass. By the late 1860s considerable traffic was also arriving (and departing) via the Yellowstone River, at an embarkation point in the Livingston area.

By the late 1860s, the indigenous peoples, denied access to their previous areas, had become a danger to the settlers, so Territorial Governor Green Clay Smith organized a militia to guard the Livingston area. The group of 600 men encamped at Fort Howie, near the mouth of Shields River, five miles (8 km) east of present-day Livingston.

In 1868 an Indian agency (including a fortified structure) was established on the Crow Reservation, at Mission Creek, southeast of Livingston. A ferry service to the fort was set up to cross the Yellowstone River, four miles (6 km) east of present-day Livingston. Benson's Landing was the small settlement that grew around the landing, and was a bustling community center for a few decades.

Interest in the Yellowstone Park area grew around 1870. By 1872, the federal government had established it as the country's first national park. By 1880 the population of the future Park County was 200. In 1881 the Northern Pacific Railway entered Montana Territory and extended a line to Livingston (which by this time had 500 inhabitants) by November 22, 1882. In 1883 the National Park branch of the Northern Pacific was completed; that year also saw completion of the east–west link of the NP lines, opening the northern part of the nation to commerce and settlement. The local population continued to grow rapidly; by 1887 the territorial legislature had authorized a county and its government had been set into motion. By 1890 the county population had reached 6,900.

Geography
The highest natural point in Montana, Granite Peak at 12,807 feet (3,904m), is in Park County. The county attained its present boundaries in 1978, when the former Yellowstone National Park (part) county-equivalent was dissolved and apportioned between Gallatin County and Park County. The geographies transferred are known as Census Tract 14 in Gallatin County and Census Tract 6 in Park County.

Major highways

  Interstate 90
  U.S. Highway 89
  U.S. Highway 191
  U.S. Highway 212
  Montana Highway 86

Adjacent counties

 Gallatin County – west
 Meagher County – north
 Sweet Grass County – east
 Stillwater County – southeast
 Carbon County – southeast
 Park County, Wyoming – south

National protected areas

 Custer National Forest (part)
 Gallatin National Forest (part)
 Lewis and Clark National Forest (part)
 Yellowstone National Park (part)

Politics
Voters in Park County tend to support the Republican Party candidate in national elections (79% since 1904).

Demographics

2000 census
At the 2000 United States census, there were 15,694 people, 6,828 households and 4,219 families in the county. The population density was 6 per square mile (2/km2). There were 8,247 housing units at an average density of 3 per square mile (1/km2). The racial makeup of the county was 96.65% White, 0.40% Black or African American, 0.92% Native American, 0.36% Asian, 0.03% Pacific Islander, 0.47% from other races, and 1.17% from two or more races. 1.84% of the population were Hispanic or Latino of any race. 23.5% were of German, 12.4% English, 9.5% Norwegian, 9.0% Irish and 7.9% American ancestry.

There were 6,828 households, of which 28.10% had children under the age of 18 living with them, 51.00% were married couples living together, 7.30% had a female householder with no husband present, and 38.20% were non-families. 32.40% of all households were made up of individuals, and 11.70% had someone living alone who was 65 years of age or older. The average household size was 2.27 and the average family size was 2.88.

The population contained 23.5% under age 18, 6.50% 18–24, 27.90% 25–44, 27.10% 45–64, and 14.90% who were 65+. The median age was 41 years. For every 100 females there were 97.40 males. For every 100 females age 18 and over, there were 96.10 males.

The median household income was $31,739 and the median family income was $40,561. Males had a median income of $28,215 and females $19,973. The per capita income was $17,704. About 7.20% of families and 11.40% of the population were below the poverty line, including 13.10% of those under age 18 and 10.10% of those age 65 or over.

2010 census
As of the 2010 United States census, there were 15,636 people, 7,310 households, and 4,177 families residing in the county. The racial makeup of the county was 96.5% white, 0.8% American Indian, 0.3% Asian, 0.1% black or African American, 0.5% from other races, and 1.6% from two or more races. Those of Hispanic or Latino origin made up 2.1% of the population. In terms of ancestry, 26.2% were German, 17.3% were English, 16.2% were Irish, 10.9% were Norwegian, and 7.4% were American.

Of the 7,310 households, 23.5% had children under the age of 18 living with them, 46.7% were married couples living together, 7.0% had a female householder with no husband present, 42.9% were non-families, and 35.7% of all households were made up of individuals. The average household size was 2.12 and the average family size was 2.75. The median age was 45.4 years.

The median income for a household in the county was $38,830 and the median income for a family was $50,252. Males had a median income of $36,878 versus $31,062 for females. The per capita income for the county was $24,717. About 7.7% of families and 13.6% of the population were below the poverty line, including 19.3% of those under age 18 and 10.7% of those age 65 or over.

Communities

City
 Livingston (county seat)

Town
 Clyde Park

Census-designated places

 Cooke City
 Corwin Springs
 Emigrant
 Gardiner
 Jardine
 Pine Creek
 Pray
 Silver Gate
 South Glastonbury
 Springdale
 Wilsall
 Wineglass

Other unincorporated communities

 Brisbin
 Carbella
 Chadborn
 Chico
 Chimney Rock
 Contact
 Grannis
 Hoppers
 Hunters Hot Springs
 Independence
 Kotke
 Miner
 Sphinx
 White City

Ghost town
 Aldridge

See also
 List of lakes in Park County, Montana
 List of mountains in Park County, Montana
 National Register of Historic Places listings in Park County, Montana

References
Specific

General
 Census Tract 14, Gallatin County; Census Tract 6, Park County US Census Bureau

 
1887 establishments in Montana Territory
Populated places established in 1887